Izabella Akhatovna Akhmadulina (10 April 1937 – 29 November 2010) was a Soviet and Russian poet, short story writer, and translator, known for her apolitical writing stance. She was part of the Russian New Wave literary movement. She was cited by Joseph Brodsky as the best living poet in the Russian language. She is known in Russia as "the voice of the epoch".

Despite the aforementioned apolitical stance of her writing, Akhmadulina was often critical of authorities in the Soviet Union, and spoke out in favour of others, including Nobel laureates Boris Pasternak, Andrei Sakharov, and Aleksandr Solzhenitsyn. She was known to international audiences via her travels abroad during the Khrushchev Thaw, during which she made appearances in sold-out stadiums. Upon her death in 2010 at the age of 73, President of Russia Dmitry Medvedev hailed her poetry as a "classic of Russian literature."

The New York Times said Akhmadulina was "always recognized as one of the Soviet Union's literary treasures and a classic poet in the long line extending from Lermontov and Pushkin." Sonia I. Ketchian, writing in The Poetic Craft of Bella Akhmadulina, called her "one of the great poets of the 20th century. There's Akhmatova, Tsvetaeva, Mandelstam, and Pasternak – and she's the fifth".

Early life, education and works
Bella Akhmadulina was born in Moscow on 10 April 1937, the only child of Akhat Valeevich Akhmadulin, a Tatar father and Nadezhda Makarovna Lazareva, a Russian-Italian mother. They underwent evacuation to Kazan when World War II broke out. 

Akhmadulina's literary career began when she was a school-girl working as a journalist at the Moscow newspaper, Metrostroevets, and improving her poetic skills at a circle organized by the poet Yevgeny Vinokurov. Her first poems appeared in the magazine October after being approved by established Soviet poets.  These first poems were published in 1955. Émigré critic Marc Slonim described her prospects as follows in 1964 (Soviet Russian Literature): "Her voice has such a purity of tone, such richness of timbre, such individuality of diction, that if her growth continues she will be able some day to succeed Akhmatova" as "the greatest living woman poet in Russia".

After finishing school, Akhmadulina entered the Maxim Gorky Literature Institute from which she graduated in 1960. While studying at the institute, she published her poems and articles in different newspapers, both official and handwritten. She was the subject of criticism in Komsomolskaya Pravda in 1957. She was expelled in 1959 (but allowed re-entry as time progressed) as a result of her opposition to the persecution of Boris Pasternak. In 1962 the first collection of her poems, titled Struna (The String), was published and was a resounding success. In spite of being expunged, many of her collections of verses were published later: Music lessons (1970), Poems (1975), Candle (1977), Dreams of Georgia (1977), The Mystery (1983), Coastline (1991), and others. A collection called Sad (Garden) led to Akhmadulina receiving the USSR State Prize in 1989.

"Many dogs and one dog", a short story written in a surreal style, was published in 1979 in Samizdat's Metropol Almanac. She assisted in the creation of Metropol. She wrote essays about Alexander Pushkin and Mikhail Lermontov. 

She appeared in sold-out stadiums in the 1960s, as did the poets Yevgeny Yevtushenko, Andrei Voznesensky and Robert Rozhdestvensky.

Her open letter was published supporting the exiled Andrei Sakharov. In October 1993, she signed the Letter of Forty-Two.

She was a journalist in a 1964 film.

Bella participated in many international poetry events including Kuala Lumpur International Poetry Reading (1988).

After the Soviet Union she published Casket and Key (1994), A Guiding Sound (1995) and One Day in December (1996).

Translations
The main themes of Akhmadulina's works are friendship, love, and relations between people. She wrote numerous essays about Russian poets and translators, some devoted to her close friend, Bulat Okudzhava. Akhmadulina avoided writing overtly political poems, but took part in political events in her youth, supporting the so-called "dissident movement". She translated into Russian poetry from France, Italy, Chechnya, Poland, Yugoslavia, Hungary, Bulgaria, Georgia, Armenia, and many others.

Akhmadulina wrote in a "resolutely apolitical" style. She made use of imagery and humour in her work. She used rhymed quatrains in her early works, which discussed ordinary, yet imaginative occurrences from daily life in language that was full of both archaisms and neologisms. Religion and philosophy became her themes as she aged and she wrote in longer forms.

Personal life

Bella's first marriage in 1954 was to Yevgeny Yevtushenko, another famous poet of the era; her second husband, whom she married in 1960, was Yuri Nagibin, a major novelist and screenwriter. Her third marriage in 1971 to film director Eldar Kuliev produced a daughter, Elizaveta Kulieva, who is also a poet. In 1974, she married her last husband, the famous artist and stage designer Boris Messerer. They had homes in Peredelkino and Moscow.

Death
Akhmadulina died at her home in Peredelkino near Moscow on 29 November 2010 at the age of 73. Akhmadulina's husband said her death was from a heart condition, describing it as a "cardiovascular crisis". Dmitry Medvedev and Vladimir Putin both paid tribute, with Medvedev writing on his blog that the death was an "irreparable loss". Medevdev also wrote that Akhmadulina's poetry was a "classic of Russian literature".

Filmography

Cameo
I Am Twenty (1961), directed by Marlen Khutsiev

Screenwriter
Clean Ponds (1965), based on the works of Yuri Nagibin
Stewardess (1967)

Bibliography

 Struna (The String), Moscow, 1962
 Oznob (Fever), Frankfurt, 1968
 Uroki Muzyki (Music Lessons), 1969
 Stikhi (Verses), 1975
 Svecha (The Candle), 1977
 Sny o Gruzii (Dreams of Georgia), 1978–79
 Metell (Snow-Storm), 1977
 Taina (The Secret), 1983
 Sad (The Garden), 1987
 Stikhotvorenie (A Poem), 1988
 Izbrannoye (Selected Verse), 1988
 Stikhi (Verses), 1988
 Poberezhye (The Coast), 1991
 Larets i Kliutch (Casket and Key), 1994
 Gryada Kamnei (The Ridge of Stone), 1995
 Samye Moi Stikhi (My Own Verses), 1995
 Zvuk Ukazuyushchiy (A Guiding Sound), 1995
 Odnazhdy v Dekabre (One Day in December), 1996

Awards and tribute
In 1977, Bella Akhmadulina became an Honorary Member of the American Academy of Arts and Letters (see AAAL website).

 USSR State Prize Laureate (1989)
 State Prize of the Russian Federation (2004)
 Order of Friendship of Peoples (1984)
 Order of Merit for the Fatherland, 2nd class (11 August 2007) – for outstanding contribution to the development of national literature and many years of creative activity; 3rd class (7 April 1997) – for services to the State and outstanding contribution to the development of national literature
 Laureate of the Foundation "Banner" (1993)
 Winner of the "Nosside" (Italy, 1994)
 Laureate of "Triumph" (1994)
 Pushkin Prize winner (1994)
 Laureate of the President of the Russian Federation in the field of Literature and Art (1998)
 Winner of "Brianza" (Italy, 1998)
 Winner of the journal "Friendship of Peoples" (2000)
 Prize winner Bulat Okudzhava (2003)
 Honorary Member of Russian Academy of Arts
 On 10 April 2017, Google Doodle commemorated her 80th birthday.

References

External links
bengali tanslation Bella Akhmadulina by moom rahman
 Poems by Bella Akhmadulina
  Additional poetry by Akhmadulina
  created by Larisa Novoseltseva

1937 births
2010 deaths
Writers from Moscow
Tatar people of Russia
Russian people of Italian descent
Russian women poets
Soviet women poets
Soviet poets
Recipients of the Order "For Merit to the Fatherland", 2nd class
State Prize of the Russian Federation laureates
Recipients of the USSR State Prize
Pushkin Prize winners
Honorary Members of the Russian Academy of Arts
Recipients of the Order of Friendship of Peoples
20th-century Russian women writers
Soviet people of Italian descent
21st-century Russian poets
21st-century Russian women writers
Maxim Gorky Literature Institute alumni
Burials at Novodevichy Cemetery
Tatar people of the Soviet Union